Pedro Jesús López Pérez de Tudela (born 25 August 1983 in Cartagena, Region of Murcia) is a Spanish former footballer who played as a defender.

External links

1983 births
Living people
Sportspeople from Cartagena, Spain
Spanish footballers
Footballers from the Region of Murcia
Association football defenders
Segunda División B players
Tercera División players
FC Cartagena footballers
Real Madrid C footballers
Real Madrid Castilla footballers
CF La Unión players
CD Torrevieja players
Serie B players
Serie C players
S.S. Arezzo players
Genoa C.F.C. players
Armenian Premier League players
FC Mika players
Spain youth international footballers
Spanish expatriate footballers
Expatriate footballers in Italy
Expatriate footballers in Armenia
Spanish expatriate sportspeople in Italy